Red Rountree may refer to:
J. L. Hunter "Red" Rountree
Walter B. "Red" Rountree